Zdeněk Mézl (31 October 1934 − 23 May 2016) was a Czech printmaker, principally known for his illustrations.

He studied at the College of Applied Arts between 1949–1953 and later graduated from the Academy of Fine Arts, Prague. Mézl illustrated several books using traditional wood engraving.

Among his published books is A Battle for Cathedral or Hey, Slavs!

References

 https://ct24.ceskatelevize.cz/kultura/1797107-zemrel-zdenek-mezl-trilobit-techniky-zvane-drevoryt

1934 births
2016 deaths
Czech illustrators
Czech engravers
Czech wood engravers
Academy of Fine Arts, Prague alumni